YEC may refer to:

 Year-End Championships, unofficial name of the annual season-ending pro tennis events
 ATP World Tour Finals (men's tennis)
 WTA Championships (women's tennis)
 Yeniche language (ISO 629-3 code), a variety of German spoken in Europe
 Ying e Chi, a non-profit organization of independent filmmakers in Hong Kong
 Yorkshire Engine Company, a former locomotive manufacturer in Sheffield, England
 Young Earth creationism, a religious belief that life and earth were created within 6 thousand to about 10 thousand years ago
 Yukon Energy Corporation, a Canadian Crown corporation in the Yukon
 Yecheon Air Base, the IATA code YEC